Saint Dasius may refer to either of two early Christian saints, both Roman soldiers executed during the Diocletian Persecution:
Dasius of Durostorum
Dasius of Nicomedia